At Devil's Gorge is a 1923 American silent Western film directed by Ashton Dearholt and starring Edmund Cobb, Helene Rosson and Wilbur McGaugh.

In a gold mining boom town, greed and jealousy becomes between two partners and launches them on a deadly rivalry.

Cast
 Edmund Cobb as Paul Clayton
 Helene Rosson as Mildred Morgan
 Wilbur McGaugh as Dav - Clayton's Partner
 William White as Pop Morgan
 Max Asher as Tobias Blake 
 Ashton Dearholt as Stranger in Town

References

Bibliography
 Langman, Larry. A Guide to Silent Westerns. Greenwood Publishing Group, 1992.
 Munden, Kenneth White. The American Film Institute Catalog of Motion Pictures Produced in the United States, Part 1. University of California Press, 1997.

External links
 

1923 films
1923 Western (genre) films
Arrow Film Corporation films
Films directed by Ashton Dearholt
Silent American Western (genre) films
1920s English-language films
1920s American films